Northrop is a surname. Notable people with the name include:

 Ann Northrop (born 1948), American journalist and activist
 Creig Northrop, American real estate agent and broker
 Cyrus Northrop (1834–1922), American university president
 Edward Skottowe Northrop (1911–2003), an American federal judge
 F. S. C. Northrop (1893–1992), American philosopher
 George C. Northrop (1819–1874), American politician and banker in Wisconsin
 Henry P. Northrop (1842–1916), American Roman Catholic bishop
 Jack Northrop (1895–1981), American aircraft industrialist and designer, founded the Northrop Corporation
 James Henry Northrop (1856–1940), English inventor
 John Howard Northrop (1891–1987), American biochemist
 Lucius B. Northrop (1811–1894), a Confederate States of America colonel
 Sandy Northrop, American television producer
 Wayne Northrop (born 1947), American actor